Grant is a town in Marshall County, Alabama, United States. As of the 2020 census, the population of Grant was 1,039, up from 896 at the 2010 census. It is included in the Huntsville-Decatur Combined Statistical Area. The town was incorporated on November 15, 1945, with Delbert Hodges serving as the first mayor.

History
Grant was settled in the late 1830s, and a post office was established in 1887. The town was named in honor of General Ulysses S. Grant, as many residents in the area had supported the Union during the American Civil War.

In 1924, the Daughters of the American Revolution (DAR) established the Kate Duncan Smith DAR School in Grant as part of a program to build schools in areas that lacked access to public education. The school, now listed on the National Register of Historic Places, still serves K-12 students, and remains the only K-12 school owned and operated by the DAR.

Geography
The town is concentrated along County Road 5 (Cathedral Caverns Highway, signed as Main Street in Grant) near the northern edge of Gunters Mountain, though the town includes corridors along CR 5 southward across the mountain to the shore of Guntersville Lake, and eastward along Baker Mountain Road to the edge of the mountain.

Demographics

2000 census
As of the census of 2000, there were 665 people, 279 households, and 200 families residing in the town. There were 306 housing units at an average density of 172.9/sq mi (66.7/km2). The racial makeup of the town was 96.54% White, 0.60% Black or African American, 1.05% Native American, 0.15% Asian, 0.15% from other races, and 1.50% from two or more races. 0.30% of the population were Hispanic or Latino of any race.

There were 279 households, out of which 33.7% had children under the age of 18 living with them, 61.3% were married couples living together, 9.0% had a female householder with no husband present, and 28.0% were non-families. 27.2% of all households were made up of individuals, and 11.5% had someone living alone who was 65 years of age or older. The average household size was 2.38 and the average family size was 2.90. The Alabama median age was 39.

In the town the population was spread out, with 25.3% under the age of 18, 6.2% from 18 to 24, 29.0% from 25 to 44, 24.7% from 45 to 64, and 14.9% who were 65 years of age or older. The median age was 38 years. For every 100 females, there were 81.2 males. For every 100 females age 18 and over, there were 79.4 males.

The median income for a household in the town was $37,188, and the median income for a family was $45,417. Males had a median income of $35,795 versus $29,750 for females. The per capita income for the town was $20,014. About 6.0% of families and 8.4% of the population were below the poverty line, including 9.8% of those under age 18 and 11.5% of those age 65 or over.

2020 census

As of the 2020 United States census, there were 1,039 people, 375 households, and 286 families residing in the town.

Notable people
Vernon Derrick, fiddle and mandolin player for Hank Williams Jr's Bama Band in the 1980s

References

External links

Best Small Towns in Alabama

Towns in Marshall County, Alabama
Towns in Alabama
Huntsville-Decatur, AL Combined Statistical Area